Green Parrot may refer to:
Norfolk parakeet
Scaly-breasted lorikeet

See also
Amazon parrot
Green parakeet
Green rosella
Pacific parrotlet
Rose-ringed parakeet